Polyscias sambucifolia, commonly known as elderberry panax or small basswood, is a species of plant native to eastern Australia.

Taxonomy
Elderberry panax was first described by Franz Sieber in 1830 as Panax sambucifolius. It was given its current name in 1894 by German botanist Hermann Harms.

The taxonomy of the small basswood has been reviewed, resulting in the recognition of three sub species: sambucifolia, decomposita and leptophylla.

Common names for these plants include small basswood, elderberry panax, ornamental ash and elderberry ash.

Description
Elderberry panax grows to 11 metres tall with a trunk diameter of 20 cm at Errinundra National Park and Otway National Park in the state of Victoria.

The trunk is straight. Bark is dark brown or black. Fairly smooth, marked by lenticles, pustules and lines.

Leaves

Leaf form varies between different sub forms of this plant. See Plant Net for detailed descriptions between the sub species.

Leaves are pinnate or bipinnate, with leaflets. Between one and six pairs of leaflets on the leaf stem. Leaflets of sub species sambucifolia are toothed, ovate in shape. The other sub species leaves are not toothed.

Leaflets 2 to 20 cm long. Leaves glossy green above, dull glaucous below. A terminal leaflet is seen on the end of the compound leaf.

Leaf stalks vary between 20 mm and no leaf stalk in sub species leptophylla. Leaf shape varies between ovate or elliptic to broad-elliptic in sub species sambucifolia. However the sessile leaflets of sub species leptophylla are oblong linear and somewhat curved (falcate) in shape. Leaf formation is two-pinnate or rarely three-pinnate in sub species decomposita.

Leaf veins evident on both the upper and lower surfaces. Sunken on the top of the leaf, raised below.

Flowers and fruit
Yellow/green flowers form on panicles from December to February. The fruit is an edible globose mericarp, 4 to 6 mm long. Mauve or blue in colour. Containing one or two seeds, 2 mm long. Fruit matures from January to April.

Distribution and habitat
The natural range of distribution is from Cape Otway (38° S) in the state of Victoria to the McPherson Range (28° S), on the border of New South Wales and Queensland. It is often seen on the edge of rainforests.

Ecology
Currawongs eat the fruit. The caterpillars of the elderberry panax leaf roller (Cryptoptila australana) eat the leaves.

Uses
Elderberry panax has attractive foliage and fruit.

References

  (other publication details, included in citation)
 Polyscias sambucifolia at NSW Flora Online Retrieved 20 August 2009

sambucifolia
Apiales of Australia
Trees of Australia
Flora of New South Wales
Flora of Queensland
Flora of Victoria (Australia)